HR is a gene encoding Protein hairless.

This gene encodes a protein whose function has been linked to hair growth. A similar protein in rat functions as a transcriptional corepressor for thyroid hormone and interacts with histone deacetylases.

Human Genetics
Variations in this gene are involved in low levels of hair (baldness / alopecia / hypotrichosis)  Mutations in this gene in humans have been documented in cases of autosomal recessive congenital alopecia and  atrichia with papular lesions.

The protein contains a Zinc finger domain.

See also
Corepressor

References

Further reading

External links
 

Transcription coregulators